The 2003 McDonald's All-American Boys Game was an All-star basketball game played on Wednesday, March 26, 2003 at the Gund Arena in Cleveland, Ohio, home of the NBA's Cleveland Cavaliers. The game's rosters featured the best and most highly recruited high school boys graduating in 2003. The game was the 26th annual version of the McDonald's All-American Game first played in 1978.

2003 game
The game was telecast live by ESPN. Luol Deng, Olu Famutimi and David Padgett did not play due to injuries. LeBron James, who played wearing number 32 instead of his usual 23, since that number was retired in honor of Michael Jordan, was named the game's MVP after finishing with 27 points, 7 rebounds and 7 assists. James was the East team leading scorer, while Shannon Brown led the West team with 23 points. Chris Paul finished with a game-high 10 assists. Of the players who participated in this game, 5 declared for the 2003 NBA Draft and were selected: LeBron James (1st overall pick), Travis Outlaw (1st round, 23rd overall), Ndudi Ebi (1st round, 26th overall), Kendrick Perkins (1st round, 27th overall) and James Lang (2nd round, 48th overall).

East roster

West roster

Coaches
The East team was coached by:
 Head Coach Ron Hecklinski of Anderson High School (Anderson, Indiana)
 Asst Coach Joe Nadaline of Anderson High School (Anderson, Indiana)
 Asst Coach Doug Mitchell of North Central High School (Indianapolis, Indiana)

The West team was coached by:
 Head Coach Gary Ernst of Mountain View High School (Mesa, Arizona)
 Asst Coach Dennis McGowan of Mountain View High School (Mesa, Arizona)
 Asst Coach Jason Palmer of Mountain View High School (Mesa, Arizona)

References

External links
McDonald's All-American on the web
McDonald's All-American rosters at Basketball-Reference.com

2002–03 in American basketball
2003
2003 in sports in Ohio
Basketball competitions in Cleveland
2000s in Cleveland